The 2018 Quidditch Premier League season was the league's second, and was contested by ten teams over the course of the summer of 2018. The ten teams were split into two divisions, with the North Division composed of the Northern Watch, Yorkshire Roses, East Midlands Archers, West Midlands Revolution, and the debuting Scottish Thistles, and the South Division composed of the London Monarchs, Southeast Knights, Southwest Broadside, Eastern Mermaids, and the debuting Welsh Dragons.

During the regular season, each division held three 'fixtures', which saw each team in that division attend and participate in round robin games. In total, teams played 12 games each during the regular season, with a total of 60 games played in total. Based on the results of those fixtures, the teams were seeded for the 2018 Quidditch Premier League Championship, which all ten qualified for. The championship was decided with a knockout bracket format

Regular season

Divisional fixtures
A total of six fixtures were held across the UK, split between the North and South Divisions.

Final Divisional Standings

Championship
The London Monarchs won the 2018 Quidditch Premier League Championship, played at the Arms Park Stadium in Cardiff, Wales, ending the season with a perfect 15–0 record. They defeated the Southeast Knights 160*-80 in the final match. By winning the title, the London Monarchs took the crown from the 2017 winners, the West Midlands Revolution.

The Championship format consisted of a double elimination bracket which was then split into upper and lower brackets, giving full placings from 1st to 10th. The latter stages of the upper bracket and lower bracket can be seen below.

Upper Bracket

Lower Bracket

See also

QuidditchUK
International Quidditch Association
Major League Quidditch
Quidditch (sport)
Fictional Quidditch

References

External links
Quidditch Premier League official website

Quidditch competitions
Quidditch